Florido River is a river of Mexico. It is a tributary of the Rio Conchos, which in turn flows into the Rio Grande.

See also
 List of rivers of Mexico
 List of tributaries of the Rio Grande

References
Atlas of Mexico, 1975.
The Prentice Hall American World Atlas, 1984.
Rand McNally, The New International Atlas, 1993.

Rio Florido
Tributaries of the Rio Grande
Rivers of Chihuahua (state)